Thomas Freeman Porter (October 30, 1847 – July 12, 1927) was an American politician who served as the 32nd Mayor of Lynn, Massachusetts.

Porter was born in Paradise, Nova Scotia. Freeman worked for a time at the Danbury News before he settled in Massachusetts. He was considered "a fine literary talent" by an early reviewer, as evidenced by his contributions to The Judge, the Boston Journal, the Yankee Blade, and the Waverley Magazine. He was an Odd Fellow and a member of the Masons.

Selected Verse

Courage

What if the morn no joy to you shall bring,
No gleam of sunbeam shine across your way;
What if no bird one joyous note shall sing
Into your listening ear through all the day!
.
What if no word of comfort you shall hear
As though the hours long you toil and strive;
What if to you no vision bright appear
To keep your hungry heart and soul alive!
.
What if the blest companionship men crave
Come not to you through all the day's long length,
But, bound and fettered even as a slave,
Within yourself you have to find your strength!
.
And if, when you have toiled and wrought alone,
The sweet reward you sought you do not gain,
And find the hoped-for bread is but stone,
In that sad hour for grief, should you complain?
.
Ah no!  It matters not if shade or sun,
Or good or ill, your efforts shall attend;
In doing you have but your duty done
As best you knew - and should do to the end.

See also
 124th Massachusetts General Court (1903)

Notes

1847 births
Mayors of Lynn, Massachusetts
Republican Party Massachusetts state senators
Republican Party members of the Massachusetts House of Representatives
Massachusetts city council members
1927 deaths
People from Annapolis County, Nova Scotia